Qaleh Bid may refer to:
 Qaleh Bid, North Khorasan
 Qaleh Bid, Sistan and Baluchestan